The Al-Tufula Center (also the Al-Tufula Pedagogical Center or Al-Tufula Pedagogical & Multipurpose Women's Center) is a women's center in Nazareth which focuses on early childhood education and women's rights. It was established in 1989, and its founder and director is Nabila Espanioly.

The work of the Al-Tufula Center is intended to support Arab women in Israel.

References

External links 

 Official website
 Official website (English)

1989 establishments in Israel
Arab Israeli culture
Arab women
Nazareth
Feminism in Israel